Josip Lucić (born 26 April 1957) is a Croatian general and former chief of General Staff of the Armed Forces of the Republic of Croatia.

Youth
Lucić was born in Posavski Podgajci near Drenovci on 26 April 1957. He finished elementary and high school in Zagreb. In 1984 he graduated at Faculty of Kinesiology of University of Zagreb, and in 1988 he became master of kinesiology.

Military career
In November 1990, Lucić voluntarily joined the units of the Croatian Ministry of Interior, where he became the Deputy Commander of the Special Battalion "Rakitje" and later Commander of the same battalion. He was also involved in the formation of an anti-terrorist police battalion. From May to December 1991, he was the Commander of 1st Guards Brigade "Tigers". As a Commander of the 1st Croatian National Guard brigade he participated in forming of second, third and fourth professional brigades of the National Guard. He was also involved in the formation of a mountain brigade, a company for alpine training, orientations, sky and mountain guides. As a Commander of the 1st Brigade he stopped the advance of the Yugoslav People's Army in the direction of Stara Gradiška-Okučani, and the forming of a defense line in front of Novska.
    
From December 1991 to April 1992, he was the Deputy Chief of Staff of the Croatian Army and he also participated in the process of organizing and training of the Croatian Army. From April to June 1992, he was the Commander of Military District Osijek. After the signing of a ceasefire treaty, he secured conditions for peace in Eastern Slavonia. Conditions for the arrival of UNTAES were also secured under his command. From June to December 1992, he was the Deputy Minister and Chief of the Personnel Department of the Ministry of Defence of Republic of Croatia. From December 1992 to March 1996, Lucić served as the Chief Inspector at the General Inspectorate of the Ministry of Defense. In February 1996, he became the Chief of the Military Academy "Petar Zrinski" in Karlovac.
    
On 20 November 2000, he became the Deputy Chief of the General Staff of Armed Forces. On 16 January 2003, he was named Chief of the General Staff by commander-in-chief of Armed Forces of Croatia and President of Croatia Stjepan Mesić. On 16 January 2008, his five-year mandate expired and he was formally relieved of his duties. On 28 February 2008, he was named, once again, Chief of General Staff, thereby becoming the first Croatian general to serve in this capacity more than once. On 1 March 2011, he was once again relieved of his duties.

Decorations

Croatian decorations
 Grand Order of King Petar Krešimir IV
 Order of Duke Domagoj
 Order of Nikola Šubić Zrinski
 Order of Ban Jelačić
 Order of Ante Starčević
 Order of the Croatian Trefoil
 Order of the Croatian Interlace
 Commemorative Medal of the Homeland War
 Commemorative Medal of the Homeland's Gratitude for 5 years of honorable service
 Commemorative Medal of the Homeland's Gratitude for 10 years of honorable service
 "Flash" Medal
 "Storm" Medal
 "Exceptional Undertaking" Medal

Foreign decorations
 Legion of Merit
 Grand Officer (International Military Sports Council)

Other offices
Member of Council for Defence and National Security (VONS)
Member of Military Council
President of Council for System of Command (SUZA)
President of High Court-Martial
President of Croatian delegation for military sports (CISM)
President of Organization Committee of 2nd Military Games in Zagreb in 1999

Private life
General Lucić is married and has two sons.

References

|-

1957 births
People from Drenovci
Croatian army officers
Military personnel of the Croatian War of Independence
Foreign recipients of the Legion of Merit
Living people
Order of Ante Starčević recipients
Order of Nikola Šubić Zrinski recipients